Ali Talib Salman Al-Ajmi commonly known as Ali Talib (born 14 November 1984) is an Omani former footballer who last played as a goalkeeper for Al-Seeb Club in the Oman Elite League.

International career
Ali was selected for the national team for the first time in 2004. He has represented the national team in the 2004 AFC Asian Cup and the 2006 FIFA World Cup qualification. He was the third substitute goalkeeper for Oman throughout the 2004 AFC Asian Cup qualification and 2004 AFC Asian Cup due to the presence of Ali Al-Habsi and Sulaiman Al Mazroui.

Honours

Club
With Sur
Sultan Qaboos Cup (0): Runners-up 2006

With Al-Nahda
Oman Super Cup (1): 2009

References

External links

Ali Talib Al-Ajmi - GOALZZ.com
Ali Talib Al-Ajmi - KOOORA.com

1984 births
Living people
Omani footballers
Oman international footballers
Association football goalkeepers
2004 AFC Asian Cup players
Sohar SC players
Sur SC players
Al-Nahda Club (Oman) players
Al-Seeb Club players